Prophets may refer to:

People
 Prophet, an interpreter or spokesperson of a deity
 Prophets in Judaism
 Prophets of Christianity
 Prophets of Islam -  beginning with Adam and ending with Muhammad
 LDS Prophets, modern day Prophets of The Church of Jesus Christ of Latter-day Saints

Religious texts
 The Prophets, Nevi'im in Hebrew, is a collection of writings comprising the second of  three main divisions in the Tanakh (Hebrew Bible; Old Testament)

Popular culture
 High Prophets (Halo), The Covenant leaders in Halo 2
 Prophet (Star Trek), in the fictional Star Trek universe
 Prophets (verse novel), a 1995 verse novel by Kwame Dawes
 Prophets (album), an album by hardcore band Counterparts